Sooryavanam is a 1998 Indian Malayalam-language film directed by Rishikesh, starring Shankar.

Plot

Sooryavanam is the story of a commando (Shankar) along with his two friends ( Madhupal & Abu Salim ) who sets a journey into Sooryavanam, a dense and dangerous forest to save hostages from terrorists. On route they wanted help in tracking routes in forest so the invite one if their colleague to help them out (Captain Raju). The rest of flim revoles around the how the these people tackle the terrorists.

Cast

Shankar as Ajith
Captain Raju as Marshall
Jagathy Sreekumar as Director Premchand
Salim Kumar as Thamarathoppu
Madhupal as Syam
Riza Bava as Terrorist Gurudas
Abu Salim as Akram
Machan Varghese as Sathyasheelan
Subair as Jerry
Anil Murali as Forest Officer
Suvarna Mathew as Maya
Kalabhavan Narayanankutty as Neelambharan
Shivaji as DIG Vinod Kumar
 Chali Pala as Vikraman
Vettoor Purushan as Chindan
Sooraj as Kaali
Kollam Shah as Police Officer
P. A. M. Rasheed as Home Minister
Roopika
Nikhila
Dayana
Bhuvanasree
Akshara
Ahana
Salim Bava
Sajan as Konkan

References

External links
 

1998 films
1990s Malayalam-language films
Films scored by Sharreth